Wolfram Samlowski (born August 16, 1954) is a medical oncologist with Comprehensive Cancer Centers of Nevada (CCCN) and a member of the Research Developmental Therapeutics and Genitourinary Committees for US Oncology.  His research interests include translational research and development of novel cancer immunotherapy agents, translational drug development as well as gene therapy.  His clinical interests are in developing more effective treatments for advanced stages of melanoma and non-melanoma skin cancers (such as Merkel Cell Carcinoma), and renal cancer.

Career 
Samlowski joined Comprehensive Cancer Centers of Nevada in 2011 as a medical oncologist and a member of the Research Developmental Therapeutics and Genitourinary Committees for US Oncology. He has been a Clinical Professor of Medicine at the University of Nevada School of Medicine since 2007.

He was the Chief, Section of Melanoma, Renal Cancer and Immunotherapy as well as a Professor in the Oncology Department at the Nevada Cancer Institute in Las Vegas, Nevada, from 2007 to 2011.

Samlowski served as the Director of Translational Research, Multidisciplinary Melanoma Program at Huntsman Cancer Institute in Salt Lake City, Utah from 2000 to 2007.

During his tenure at University of Utah (1981–2007), Samlowski held many positions including various faculty appointments with the Hematology/Oncology program (1981–1997), Director, Cancer Immunotherapy Program (1987–2007) and Professor, Division of Oncology (1997–2007).

Samlowski earned his medical degree from Ohio State University in 1978, completed his internal medicine residency at Wayne State University in Detroit, Michigan, and his clinical fellowship in hematology/oncology at the University of Utah, Salt Lake City, Utah.

Professional honors 
Top Doctors by Vegas Seven Magazine, 2014.
Best Doctors by Desert Companion Magazine, 2013.
Healthcare Headliners by Vegas, Inc. Magazine, 2012.
Assistant Chief Medical Resident, Wayne State Univ., Detroit, Michigan, 1980–1981
Veterans Administration Performance Award 1987
America's Top Doctors (Castle Connolly)
Americas Top Doctors for Cancer (Castle Connolly)

Professional societies 
Fellow, American College of Physicians (ACP)
American Federation of Clinical Research (AFCR)
American Association for Immunology (AAI)
American Society for Clinical Oncology (ASCO)
American Association for Cancer Research (AACR)
International Society for Biological Therapy of Cancer (iSBTc)
Society for Pigment Cell and Melanoma Research

Current research funding 
Department of Defense (DOD) PRCRP Concept Award-Targeted RF Ablation of Tumors Using Monocyte/Macrophage Carriers of Conductive Nanoparticles. June 1, 2011 – May 31, 2012, Principal Investigator: H. Michael Gach, Co-investigator (5 percent effort).
Bristol Myers Squib (Investigator initiated clinical trial): Evaluation of concurrent ipilimumab therapy and radiosurgery for oligometastatic but unresectable malignant melanoma. Principal investigator (W. Samlowski) 9/1/2011-12/31/2012.

Patents 
Fowers KD, Zentner GM, Baudys M, Jurek M, Samlowski W:  Formulations of lymphokines and method of use thereof for local or both local and systemic control of proliferative cell disorders (US Patent US2006/0159657, Europe 2739877.5-2108)
Samlowski WE, Adams NB, McGregor JR:  Gene therapy of cancer using an IL-2 transmembrane construct (US 7,407,777, World 2004/080404).
Samlowski WE, Kondapaneni M, McGregor JR.  Methods and compounds for the inhibition of eNOS activity.  (US 5/23/06  US2007012410 Europe 5/23/07  077952298.4-1216)

Published works
Natl. Cooperative Oncology Group Clinical Trial Authorship
Evaluation of biologic markers that may predict sensitivity or resistance of recurrent or metastatic squamous cell carcinoma of the head and neck (SCCHN) to phase II chemotherapy agents: Pathology ancillary study (SWOG 9807).  Primary study coordinator.
Evaluation of the combination of docetaxel/carboplatin in patients with metastatic or recurrent squamous cell carcinoma of the head and neck (SCCHN)(SWOG 9902).  Primary study coordinator.
Evaluation of 3-hour infusion of paclitaxel plus cisplatin and 5-fluorouracil in patients with advanced/recurrent squamous cell carcinoma of the head and neck (SCCHN):  Phase II (S0007).  Co-investigator.
A Phase II trial of imatinib mesylate (Gleevec) in neuroendocrine carcinoma of the skin (Merkel Cell Carcinoma) (S0331).  Primary study coordinator.

Peer-reviewed publications
Samlowski WE, Kondapaneni M, McGregor JR, Tharkar, S, Laubach VE, Salvemini D. Endothelial nitric oxide synthase (eNOS) is a key mediator of interleukin-2 (IL-2) induced hypotension and vascular leak syndrome. J Immunother 34:419-27, 2011.
Eroglu Z, Kong M, Jakowatz JG, Akerly W, Samlowski W, Fruehauf JP.  Phase II clinical trial evaluating docetaxel, vinorelbine and GM-CSF in stage IV melanoma. (in press, Cancer Chemother Pharmacol).
Donepudi S, DeConti R, Samlowski WE.  Recent advances in understanding the genetics etiology and treatment of Merkel cell carcinoma.  (in press, Seminars in Oncology).
Samlowski EE, Dechet C, Weissman A, Samlowski WE.  Large cell non-Hodgkin’s lymphoma masquerading as renal carcinoma with IVC thrombosis: A case report. (in press, Journal of Medical Case Reports).

Book chapters, reviews, editorials and letters to editor

Eroglu Z, Kong M, Jakowatz JG, Akerly W, Samlowski W, Fruehauf JP.  “Phase II clinical trial evaluating docetaxel, vinorelbine and GM-CSF in stage IV melanoma.” Cancer Chemother Pharmacol 68:1081-1087, 2011
Wong B, Samlowski WE.  Renal Cancer.  In "Medical Therapy in Urology", Springer-Verlag, 2010.  pp 17–31

Samlowski WE, Becker J. The Potential for Targeted Therapy of Merkel Cell Carcinoma.  In Merkel Cell Carcinoma:  A Multidisciplinary Approach by Sondak VK, Messina JL, Zager JS, Deconti RC, editors, Imperial College Press, London, United Kingdom 2010.
Fawaz S, Samlowski WE.  A commentary on current management strategies for brain metastases from "radioresistant" tumors. In Brain Metastases: Symptoms, Diagnosis and Treatment. (In press), Nova Science Publishers 2010.
Loudyi A, Samlowski WE.  Brain metastases from clear cell renal cancer.  In: Tumors of the central nervous system. Hayat MA, ed.  In press, Springer, New York 2010.
Gonsalves-Shapiro D, Samlowski WE.  Management of melanoma brain metastases in the era of targeted therapy. In: Melanoma: From Research to Treatment, Ascierto, PA, Kirkwood, JA, Marincola F, Palmieri G., eds, Hinawi, New York, (in press).

In the media
Avoiding doctors? Price of that decision may surprise you. Las Vegas Review-Journal, April 1, 2013
New Drug Treats Advanced Melanoma. KLAS-TV Las Vegas, November 15, 2011

References

External links
Comprehensive Cancer Centers of Nevada homepage

1954 births
Living people
American oncologists
Ohio State University College of Medicine alumni